Pallaseidae (from the genus name Pallasea) is a family of amphipod crustaceans endemic to Lake Baikal. Some species are also found in the Angara River which flows out of Lake Baikal, and one species is distributed throughout Northern Palearctic. The composition of the family is a subject of discussion, with different sources listing either 9 genera and 58 species, or 8 genera and 20 species. They are benthic, nectobenthic or epibiotic.

The following genera are placed in the family Pallaseidae:
Babr Kamaltynov & Väinölä, 2001
Burchania Tachteew, 2000
Hakonboeckia Stebbing, 1899
Homalogammarus Bazikalova, 1945
Pallasea Bate, 1862
Pallaseopsis Kamaltynov & Väinölä, 2001
Pentagonurus Sowinsky, 1915
Propachygammarus Bazikalova, 1945

References

Gammaridea
Freshwater crustaceans of Asia
Crustacean families